Will Long (born December 8, 1980) is an American artist and musician. His music is "mostly created using tape loops", "primarily from personal memories and thought experiments", which "capture very specific instances in Long’s life." He is known for his collaboration with Danielle Baquet-Long in the band Celer, and for his continuation of Celer after her death in 2009. He is also known for his work producing deep house music under his own name, described as "deep, expansive affairs, riven with vocal samples culled from political speeches". He has lived in Tokyo, Japan since 2010.

Discography

Long Trax (Comatonse Recordings, 2016)
Long Trax 2 (Smalltown Supersound, 2018)
Long Trax 3 (Self-released, 2020)

Celer

References

External links
 
 Celer at "Discogs"
 Will Long homepage

1980 births
American electronic musicians
Ambient musicians
American composers
People from Jackson, Mississippi
20th-century American musicians
American expatriates in Japan
American sound artists
Living people